WWE Raw is a professional wrestling television program.

WWE Raw or WWF Raw may also refer to:

Championships
WWE Raw Women's Championship
WWE Raw Tag Team Championship 
WWE Raw Championship also known as the WWE Universal Championship

Television
List of WWE Raw special episodes
WWE Raw 25 Years
WWE Raw 1000
WWE Raw Diva Search

Video games
WWF Raw (1994 video game)
WWE Raw 2
WWF Raw (2002 video game)
WWE SmackDown! vs. Raw
WWE SmackDown! vs. Raw 2006
WWE SmackDown vs. Raw 2007
WWE SmackDown vs. Raw 2008
WWE SmackDown vs. Raw 2009
WWE SmackDown vs. Raw 2010
WWE SmackDown vs. Raw 2011
WWE SmackDown vs. Raw Online

Other
 Raw (WWE brand) a brand within the WWE
 WWE Raw roster the roster of those within the Raw brand
List of WWE Raw on-air personalities
List of WWE Raw guest stars
 History of WWE Raw